Philip Freriks (born 27 July 1944) is a Dutch journalist, columnist and television presenter.

He is known for presenting the NOS Journaal from 1996 until 2009. He also presented the Groot Dictee der Nederlandse Taal from 1990 until 2016 and in 2018.

Freriks is also known as presenter of the television quiz show De Slimste Mens.

Also, he acted as the narrator in the 2012 edition of The Passion.

External links

References 

1944 births
Living people
Dutch journalists
Dutch television news presenters
20th-century Dutch male actors
21st-century Dutch male actors
20th-century Dutch journalists
21st-century Dutch journalists